Dayte tank (!) is a Russian rock band from Kolomna, founded by Dmitry Mozzhukhin and Alexander Romankin in 2007. Today the collective consists of five musicians. The band periodically releases new songs and annually gives solo concerts in Moscow, St. Petersburg and other cities of Russia, and also performs at music festivals.

Until 2011, the group was called "Give Us A Tank (!)". It comes from "giveusatank" - a cheat code from the video game GTA 3. The name was later translated into Russian to make it easier to pronounce and remember.

Line-up

Current line-up 

 Dmitry Mozzhukhin - vocals, guitar
 Maxim Kulsha - guitar
 Sergey Akimov - bass guitar
 Alexander Timofeev - saxophone
 Ilya Gerasimenko - drums

Former members 

 Alexander Romankin
 Yuri Gaer
 Victor Dryzhov

Discography

Studio albums

Singles

Video 

 Впереди
 Вуаля
 Шалаш
 Из земли
 Love-love
 Утро
 Друг
 Спам
 Шум
 Смешно
 Я
 Мы
 Вы
 Волна
 Крепость
 Шанс
 Сказки

References

Interviews 

 
 
 
 
 
 
 
 
 
 

Russian rock music groups
Russian punk rock groups
Russian indie rock groups